Larry P. Roberts (June 2, 1963 – December 5, 2016) was an American football defensive end of the National Football League (NFL).

Career
Roberts was born in Dothan, Alabama, and began his football career at Northview High School in Dothan. He subsequently starred as a defensive end at the University of Alabama. In Round 2 of the 1986 NFL Draft, at 6’3" and 264 lbs, Roberts was drafted as the #39 pick. Roberts played eight consecutive seasons for the San Francisco 49ers, from 1986 to 1993. As a defensive lineman, Roberts was a part of the starting lineup in Super Bowl XXIII against the Cincinnati Bengals in 1989, and in Super Bowl XXIV against the Denver Broncos in 1990. Roberts also participated in 12 playoff games during his tenure with the 49ers.

Personal life
Roberts resided in Atlanta with his wife and their two children. He died on December 5, 2016, at the age of 53. He was diagnosed with diabetes in his later years, which led to the amputation of both of his legs.

Professional statistics

References

External links
Stats at fantasyfootballchallenge.com
Stats at pro-football-reference.com

1963 births
2016 deaths
Sportspeople from Dothan, Alabama
American football defensive ends
Alabama Crimson Tide football players
San Francisco 49ers players